Solomon Airport  is located  west of the Karijini National Park, Western Australia.

See also
 List of airports in Western Australia
 Aviation transport in Australia

References

External links
 Airservices Aerodromes & Procedure Charts

Pilbara airports
Fortescue Metals Group